Audubon Park is a borough in Camden County, in the U.S. state of New Jersey. As of the 2020 United States census, the borough's population was 991, a decrease of 32 (−3.1%) from the 2010 census count of 1,023, which in turn reflected a decline of 79 (−7.2%) from the 1,102 counted in the 2000 census. The borough is the fifth-smallest municipality in the state by area.

Audubon Park was incorporated as a borough on July 3, 1947, from portions of Audubon Borough, based on the results of a referendum held on October 28, 1947, making it the newest municipality in Camden County. Audubon Park is a dry town where alcohol is not permitted to be sold by law.

Audubon Park had the third-highest property tax rate in New Jersey, with an equalized rate of 6.311% in 2020, compared to 3.470% in Camden County and a statewide average of 2.279%.

History
Audubon Park was established as a community within Audubon in 1941 with the construction of 500 housing units for employees of New York Shipbuilding in Camden, New Jersey. It is named for naturalist John James Audubon. This was the first of eight projects undertaken by the Mutual Ownership Defense Housing Division of the Federal Works Agency under the leadership of Colonel Lawrence Westbrook. Residents of Audubon, seeking to rid itself of the development's Democratic voters and its public school students, pushed for and passed a referendum to form Audubon Park in 1947. The Audubon Mutual Housing Corporation owns and administers all property in the borough and in turn is responsible for renting homes to residents.

Geography
According to the United States Census Bureau, the borough had a total area of 0.17 square miles (0.44 km2), including 0.15 square miles (0.39 km2) of land and 0.02 square miles (0.05 km2) of water (10.59%).

Audubon Park borders the Camden County municipalities of Audubon, Haddon Township and Oaklyn.

Demographics

2010 census

The Census Bureau's 2006–2010 American Community Survey showed that (in 2010 inflation-adjusted dollars) median household income was $41,726 (with a margin of error of +/− $5,661) and the median family income was $53,036 (+/− $8,477). Males had a median income of $46,176 (+/− $8,213) versus $38,036 (+/− $5,655) for females. The per capita income for the borough was $23,855 (+/− $2,141). About 5.7% of families and 7.4% of the population were below the poverty line, including 12.0% of those under age 18 and 7.9% of those age 65 or over.

2000 census
As of the 2000 United States census there were 1,102 people, 496 households, and 302 families residing in the borough. The racial makeup of the borough was 98.91% White, 0.36% African American, 0.09% Native American, 0.18% Asian, 0.09% from other races, and 0.36% from two or more races. Hispanic or Latino of any race were 0.64% of the population.

There were 496 households, out of which 22.0% had children under the age of 18 living with them, 40.7% were married couples living together, 16.5% had a female householder with no husband present, and 39.1% were non-families. 35.3% of all households were made up of individuals, and 15.3% had someone living alone who was 65 years of age or older. The average household size was 2.22 and the average family size was 2.88.

In the borough the population was spread out, with 21.2% under the age of 18, 4.9% from 18 to 24, 28.5% from 25 to 44, 27.0% from 45 to 64, and 18.3% who were 65 years of age or older. The median age was 42 years. For every 100 females, there were 80.7 males. For every 100 females age 18 and over, there were 73.9 males.

The median income for a household in the borough was $34,643, and the median income for a family was $41,029. Males had a median income of $36,250 versus $25,662 for females. The per capita income for the borough was $16,926. About 9.0% of families and 8.8% of the population were below the poverty line, including 9.1% of those under age 18 and 8.0% of those age 65 or over.

Government

Local government
Audubon Park is governed under the Borough form of New Jersey municipal government, which is used in 218 municipalities (of the 564) statewide, making it the most common form of government in New Jersey. The governing body is comprised of a Mayor and a Borough Council, with all positions elected at-large on a partisan basis as part of the November general election. A Mayor is elected directly by the voters to a four-year term of office. The Borough Council is comprised of six members elected to serve three-year terms on a staggered basis, with two seats coming up for election each year in a three-year cycle. The Borough form of government used by Audubon Park is a "weak mayor / strong council" government in which council members act as the legislative body with the mayor presiding at meetings and voting only in the event of a tie. The mayor can veto ordinances subject to an override by a two-thirds majority vote of the council. The mayor makes committee and liaison assignments for council members, and most appointments are made by the mayor with the advice and consent of the council.

, the Mayor of Audubon Park is Republican Lawrence "Larry" Pennock, whose term of office ends December 31, 2022. Members of the Borough Council are Council President Karen Lewis (D, 2023), John Carpinelli (R, 2024), Judith DiPasquale (D, 2023), Thomas Geobel (D, 2022), Gloria Jones (D, 2022) and Kirsten Stokes (R, 2024).

In January 2014, the Borough Council selected John Carpinelli from among three names nominated by the Democratic municipal committee to fill the vacant seat that had been held by Frederick T. Passon until his death. Carpinelli served on an interim basis until the November 2014 general election, when he was elected to serve the balance of the term expiring in December 2015.

In May 2012, the Borough council chose Judy DiPasquale from among a list of three names provided to fill the vacant seat of Charles Beeman.

Federal, state and county representation
Audubon Park is located in the 1st Congressional district and is part of New Jersey's 5th state legislative district. Prior to the 2011 reapportionment following the 2010 Census, Audubon Park had been in the 6th state legislative district.

Politics
As of March 2011, there were a total of 800 registered voters in Audubon Park, of which 535 (66.9% vs. 31.7% countywide) were registered as Democrats, 55 (6.9% vs. 21.1%) were registered as Republicans and 210 (26.3% vs. 47.1%) were registered as Unaffiliated. There were no voters registered to other parties. Among the borough's 2010 Census population, 78.2% (vs. 57.1% in Camden County) were registered to vote, including 90.2% of those ages 18 and over (vs. 73.7% countywide).

In the 2012 presidential election, Democrat Barack Obama received 368 votes (67.9% vs. 54.8% countywide), ahead of Republican Mitt Romney with 164 votes (30.3% vs. 43.5%) and other candidates with 7 votes (1.3% vs. 0.9%), among the 542 ballots cast by the borough's 832 registered voters, for a turnout of 65.1% (vs. 70.4% in Camden County). In the 2008 presidential election, Democrat Barack Obama received 374 votes (64.5% vs. 66.2% countywide), ahead of Republican John McCain with 183 votes (31.6% vs. 30.7%) and other candidates with 17 votes (2.9% vs. 1.1%), among the 580 ballots cast by the borough's 814 registered voters, for a turnout of 71.3% (vs. 71.4% in Camden County). In the 2004 presidential election, Democrat John Kerry received 425 votes (69.0% vs. 61.7% countywide), ahead of Republican George W. Bush with 183 votes (29.7% vs. 36.4%) and other candidates with 2 votes (0.3% vs. 0.8%), among the 616 ballots cast by the borough's 810 registered voters, for a turnout of 76.0% (vs. 71.3% in the whole county).

In the 2013 gubernatorial election, Republican Chris Christie received 69.5% of the vote (216 cast), ahead of Democrat Barbara Buono with 29.9% (93 votes), and other candidates with 0.6% (2 votes), among the 323 ballots cast by the borough's 831 registered voters (12 ballots were spoiled), for a turnout of 38.9%. In the 2009 gubernatorial election, Democrat Jon Corzine received 184 ballots cast (52.0% vs. 53.8% countywide), ahead of Republican Chris Christie with 137 votes (38.7% vs. 38.5%), Independent Chris Daggett with 18 votes (5.1% vs. 4.5%) and other candidates with 9 votes (2.5% vs. 1.1%), among the 354 ballots cast by the borough's 809 registered voters, yielding a 43.8% turnout (vs. 40.8% in the county).

Education
Audubon Park is a non-operating school district, having closed its lone school in 1979, after which students were sent outside of the borough as part of a sending/receiving relationship. Public school students from Audubon Park attend school in Audubon, having been consolidated into the Audubon School District. The Audubon School District serves public school students in pre-kindergarten through twelfth grade. As of the 2020–21 school year, the district, comprised of three schools, had an enrollment of 1,463 students and 122.2 classroom teachers (on an FTE basis), for a student–teacher ratio of 12.0:1. Schools in the district (with 2020–21 enrollment data from the National Center for Education Statistics) are 
Haviland Avenue School with 254 students in grades PreK-2, 
Mansion Avenue School with 372 students in grades 3-6 and 
Audubon High School with 818 students in grades 7-12.

Students from Audubon Park, and from all of Camden County, are eligible to attend the Camden County Technical Schools, a countywide public school district that serves the vocational and technical education needs of students at the high school and post-secondary level at Gloucester Township Technical High School in the Sicklerville section of Gloucester Township or Pennsauken Technical High School in Pennsauken Township. Students are accepted based on district admission standards and costs of attendance and transportation are covered by the home district of each student.

Transportation

Roads and highways

A small  piece of New Jersey Route 76C connects Route 168 in Audubon Park to Interstate 76 and Interstate 676.

Public transportation 
NJ Transit bus service is available in the borough on routes 400 (between Sicklerville in Winslow Township and Philadelphia) and 450 (between the Cherry Hill Mall and Camden).

References

External links

 Audubon Park official website
 Audubon School District
 
 School Data for the Audubon School District, National Center for Education Statistics

 
1947 establishments in New Jersey
Borough form of New Jersey government
Boroughs in Camden County, New Jersey
New Jersey District Factor Group none
Populated places established in 1947